Sherenden is a settlement in the Hastings District and Hawke's Bay Region of New Zealand's North Island.

It was established around a school house in 1916. The community fundraised to build a swimming pool in 1961.

The community of Otamauri is located west of the Sherenden village.

Demographics

Sherenden-Crownthorpe had a population of 1,317 at the 2018 New Zealand census, an increase of 111 people (9.2%) since the 2013 census, and an increase of 297 people (29.1%) since the 2006 census. There were 468 households, comprising 666 males and 651 females, giving a sex ratio of 1.02 males per female. The median age was 43.0 years (compared with 37.4 years nationally), with 279 people (21.2%) aged under 15 years, 180 (13.7%) aged 15 to 29, 723 (54.9%) aged 30 to 64, and 138 (10.5%) aged 65 or older.

Ethnicities were 94.3% European/Pākehā, 11.4% Māori, 1.1% Pacific peoples, 1.4% Asian, and 2.5% other ethnicities. People may identify with more than one ethnicity.

The percentage of people born overseas was 11.6, compared with 27.1% nationally.

Although some people chose not to answer the census's question about religious affiliation, 55.6% had no religion, 34.6% were Christian, 0.7% had Māori religious beliefs and 0.9% had other religions.

Of those at least 15 years old, 222 (21.4%) people had a bachelor's or higher degree, and 153 (14.7%) people had no formal qualifications. The median income was $41,100, compared with $31,800 nationally. 231 people (22.3%) earned over $70,000 compared to 17.2% nationally. The employment status of those at least 15 was that 642 (61.8%) people were employed full-time, 183 (17.6%) were part-time, and 21 (2.0%) were unemployed.

Education

References

Hastings District
Populated places in the Hawke's Bay Region